"Head Over Heels" is a song recorded by Canadian country rock group Blue Rodeo. It was released in 1995 as the sixth single from their fifth studio album, Five Days in July. It peaked at number 4 on the RPM Country Tracks chart and number 16 on the RPM Adult Contemporary Tracks chart in May 1995. It was reached the top 40 on the RPM Top Singles chart.

Chart performance

Year-end charts

References

1993 songs
1995 singles
Blue Rodeo songs
Warner Music Group singles
1990 songs
Songs written by Greg Keelor
Songs written by Jim Cuddy